Kim Tok-hun (born 1961) is a North Korean politician serving as the Premier of North Korea since August 2020. He is also a full member on the Presidium of the Politburo of the Workers' Party of Korea and served as the chief of the parliamentary budget committee. He was formerly the delegate for North-South cooperation before being appointed a Vice Premier by the Supreme People's Assembly.

Kim Tok-hun has been a member of the Central Committee of the Workers' Party of Korea since the 7th Congress in May 2016. He later joined the party Politburo on 11 April 2019 as an alternate member, then he was promoted to full member on 31 December, and concurrently as a party vice-chairman, with a portfolio that included heading the Cadre Affairs Department. He possibly earned Kim Jong-un's approval uncovering a corruption scandal involving cadre training facilities in February of the next year. In April 2020 he was also elected chairman of the Budget Committee of the Supreme People's Assembly.

On 13 August 2020, in the wake of COVID-19 spillover in North Korea and floods hitting the southern part of the country, he was appointed premier of the cabinet by Kim Jong-un, and elevated to the top-level Politburo Presidium. He has recently been the second-highest ranking official in North Korea after Kim Jong-un.

References

|-

Government ministers of North Korea
1961 births
Living people
Date of birth missing (living people)
Place of birth missing (living people)
Prime Ministers of North Korea
Members of the 7th Central Committee of the Workers' Party of Korea
Members of the 7th Politburo of the Workers' Party of Korea
Members of the 7th Presidium of the Workers' Party of Korea
Members of the 8th Presidium of the Workers' Party of Korea
Vice Chairmen of the Workers' Party of Korea and its predecessors